Roland Bartholomew (born 1915) was an English professional footballer who played as an outside left.

Career
Born in Great Harwood, Bartholomew grew up in Manchester and played for North Manchester Secondary School and Urmston Old Boys. He signed amateur forms for Leeds United in 1934, but never played a first-team game for the club. He moved from Leeds United to Bradford City in May 1935; he moved from Bradford City to Grimsby Town in June 1938. For Bradford City, he made 100 appearances in the Football League, scoring 14 goals; he also scored 7 goals in 10 FA Cup appearances. He played in every League game of the 1936–37 season for Bradford City. Bartholomew scored four goals in 12 League appearances for Grimsby Town, before World War Two ended his career.

Sources

References

1915 births
Year of death missing
English footballers
Leeds United F.C. players
Bradford City A.F.C. players
Grimsby Town F.C. players
English Football League players
Association football forwards
People from Great Harwood
20th-century English people